The women's 4 × 100 metres relay event at the 1997 Summer Universiade was held on 31 August at the Stadio Cibali in Catania, Italy.

Results

References

Athletics at the 1997 Summer Universiade
1997 in women's athletics
1997